Selyf ("Solomon") is a Welsh male given name. It may refer to:

 Salomon of Cornwall (5th century), a prince of Cornwall and father of Saint Cybi
 Selyf ap Cynan (called Sarffgadau, "Battle-serpent"), a 7th-century king of Powys killed at the Battle of Chester

See also
 Solomon, known as Selyf in Welsh
 Solomon (name)